Norfolk Hero was launched at Yarmouth in 1799. She traded with North American and the West Indies. In 1808 she was captured, but quickly recaptured. She continued to trade widely until she was lost in November 1827.

Career
Norfolk Hero first appeared in Lloyd's Register (LR) in the volume for 1799.

Lloyd's List reported in April 1808 that Norfolk Hero and Heroine had been captured, retaken, and brought into Barbados. Norfolk Hero had been sailing to St Kitts, and Heroine had been sailing to Tortola. Unfortunately, press reports did not name the captor(s) or recaptor(s).

On 21 May 1817, Norfolk Hero, Dow, master, put into Grenada. She had been on her way from Tobago to London when she had developed a leak. It was expected that she would have to unload 150 cases to be repaired. She discharged some hogsheads of sugar and 100 puncheons of rum. After she was repaired she proceeded on her voyage on 7 June. On 11 June she was at St Thomas.

Fate
Norfolk Hero, Woodward, master, was lost in November 1827 off Aldeburgh, Suffolk. She was on a voyage from Riga to London.

Citations

1799 ships
Age of Sail merchant ships of England
Captured ships
Maritime incidents in November 1827